The 2018 Under-19 Cricket World Cup in New Zealand was contested by sixteen teams, eleven of which qualified automatically. The other five places in the tournament were determined by a series of regional qualifiers, with one place being granted to each International Cricket Council (ICC) development region (Africa, the Americas, Asia, East Asia-Pacific, and Europe).

Automatic qualification
The ten full members of the ICC as at 2016 qualified automatically for the Under-19 World Cup. In early 2016, it was determined that the top-placed ICC associate member at the 2016 Under-19 World Cup in Bangladesh would also qualify automatically for the 2018 event. That team was Namibia, which defeated another associate member, Nepal, in the seventh-place play-off.

Regional qualification

Africa

Division Two
The Africa Division Two tournament was played in Benoni, South Africa, from 10 to 18 September 2016. Ghana (the winner) and Botswana (the runner-up) both qualified for Division One.

Division One
The Africa Division One tournament was played in Nairobi, Kenya, from 1–10 July 2017. Kenya won the tournament on net run rate from Uganda to qualify for their first World Cup since 2002; four African teams were played in the World Cup for the first time since 2006.

Americas
ICC U19 World Cup Qualifier Americas Region was played in Toronto, Canada from July 17 to July 23, 2017. Teams were Bermuda, Canada, and USA, and format was a double round robin. Canada qualified for the 2019 ICC U19 World Cup in New Zealand on Net Run Rate.

Asia

Division Two

The Asia Division Two tournament was played in Kuala Lumpur, Malaysia, from 26 September to 6 October 2016, and featured ten teams. Malaysia defeated Singapore in the final, with both teams qualifying for Division One.

Points Table

Group A

Group B

Division One

The Asia Division One tournament was played in Singapore from July 2017 to july2017.

Afghanistan and Nepal, teams who played on last Under 19 World Cup were joined by two finalist of 2016 ICC Under-19 Cricket World Cup Asia Qualifier Division Two, Singapore and Malaysia. Afghanistan win this tournament by win of 6 out of 6game while Nepal win 4 matches out of 6 matches and Afghanistan was qualified for 2018 u-19 cricket world cup  held in New Zealand .

East Asia-Pacific
The East Asia-Pacific regional qualifier was held in Apia, Samoa, from 8–16 August 2017. Four teams took part in a double round-robin: Fiji, Papua New Guinea, Samoa, and Vanuatu.

Europe

Division Two
The Europe Division Two tournament was played in the Netherlands from 23 to 30 July 2016. It was won by Denmark.

Division One

The Europe Division One tournament was played in Jersey from 23 July to 1 August 2017. The four participating teams were Denmark, Ireland, Jersey, and Scotland.

References

World Cup qualification, 2018
Qualification
Qualification for cricket competitions